Nico Malan Pass is situated in the Eastern Cape province of South Africa, on the regional tarred road R67 between Fort Beaufort and Whittlesea.

Mountain passes of the Eastern Cape